Jacob Henry House is a historic home located at Beaufort, Carteret County, North Carolina. It was built about 1794, and is a -story, four bay by four bay, Federal style frame dwelling. It rests on a high foundation of ballast stone and has a two-tier, full-width front porch.  It was the home of Jacob Henry, who in 1809 entered into a debate over his right as a Jew to hold state office. Henry served in the North Carolina legislature in 1808 and 1809.

It was listed on the National Register of Historic Places in 1973.

References

Houses on the National Register of Historic Places in North Carolina
Greek Revival houses in North Carolina
Houses completed in 1794
Houses in Carteret County, North Carolina
National Register of Historic Places in Carteret County, North Carolina
1794 establishments in the United States